The White Horse Inn (German:Im weißen Rößl) is a 1926 German silent comedy film directed by Richard Oswald and starring Liane Haid, Max Hansen, and Henry Bender. It is based on the play The White Horse Inn by Oskar Blumenthal and Gustav Kadelburg.

Cast
 Liane Haid as Josefa Voglhuber, Wirtin 
 Max Hansen as Leopold Brandmayer, Zahlkellner 
 Henry Bender as Wilhelm Giesecke 
 Livio Pavanelli as Doctor Siedler 
 Maly Delschaft as Ottilie Giesecke 
 Hermann Picha as Hinzelmann, Privatgelehrter 
 Ferdinand Bonn as Bauer 
 Anton Pointner   
 Anita Dorris

See also
 When I Came Back (sequel, 1926)

External links

1926 films
1926 comedy films
German comedy films
Films of the Weimar Republic
German silent feature films
Films directed by Richard Oswald
Films set in Austria
Films set in restaurants
German films based on plays
German black-and-white films
Silent comedy films
1920s German films